Rapid Results is a structured process that mobilizes teams to achieve tangible results over a rapid time frame and accelerate organizational learning. Schaffer Consulting, a management consulting firm headquartered in Stamford, Connecticut, developed the Rapid Results approach based on their experience working with clients across industries to achieve breakthrough levels of performance. The approach and its practitioners have since been recognized in The New York Times, Harvard Business Review, and Foreign Policy, among other publications.

Methodology 

The objective of Rapid Results initiatives is to achieve dramatic results, formed under the pressure of short time frames and ambitious targets. Rapid Results initiatives begin with a call to action for significant performance improvement delivered by a single leader or group of leaders to cross-functional teams of 8-10 people. Team members then set and commit to "seemingly unreasonable" short-term goals — often in 100 days or less — tied to the strategic imperatives outlined by their leaders. Teams then experiment with new ways of working, capturing learnings along the way, and persisting until they achieve desired outcomes. Rapid Results aims to stimulate innovation, collaboration, and more effective execution in and across organizations and stakeholder groups. Leaders leverage initial results to create longer-term and wider-scale impact in subsequent waves of Rapid Results projects.

Business impact 

Leaders in many industries leverage Rapid Results to achieve performance goals, including accelerating growth, increasing productivity, and realizing cost savings.

Lynn Chambers, group head of Talent at the London Stock Exchange Group, says, “This approach can be taken to accelerate progress on almost any goal.” Dean Scarborough, president and chief executive officer of Avery Dennison describes Rapid Results “driving an incredible amount of creativity” among team members. Martha Marsh, former president and CEO of Stanford Hospital and Clinics, observes that Rapid Results “provide an intense focus on getting results, while helping build the capacity of our organization to drive transformational change.”

Rapid Results Institute 

Formed in 2007, the Rapid Results Institute works with a broad range of partners — including government agencies, not-for-profit organizations, and international development agencies — across a wide spectrum of development initiatives. Past and ongoing projects include H.I.V. prevention in Eritrea and Ethiopia, public sector reform in Kenya, waste management in Brazil, and housing homeless veterans in the United States.

The Rapid Results Institute is partnering with the 100,000 Homes Campaign and the US Department of Veterans Affairs to house homeless veterans across the United States.

Development impact 

Following a project on HIV/AIDS awareness among youth, Eritrean Minister of Education Osman Saleh called the Rapid Results approach "a new movement." In Kenya, an independent evaluation by the AIDS Research and Treatment journal reported that “significant improvement in PMTCT [prevention of mother-to-child-transmission] services can be achieved through introduction of an RRI [Rapid Results Initiative], which appears to lead to sustained benefits for pregnant HIV-infected women and their infants.”

Due to its success in a variety of contexts, the Rapid Results approach has been adopted by the World Bank, as well as by many Kenyan government ministries.

References

Change management
Non-profit organizations based in the United States
Strategy consulting
Project management